Dagamtenga, also spelt Dagemtenga, is a commune in the Dialgaye Department of Kouritenga Province in the Centre-Est region of Burkina Faso. It had a population of 2,393 in 2006.

In the 2006 census, one of Dagamtenga's neighbourhoods, Guetenga, also spelt Guitanga, was listed as a separate settlement with a population of 300, with Dagamtenga's population as 2,093. This would give the combined Dagamtenga-Guitanga settlement a total population of 2,393 in 2006. This population division differs from the divisions in the neighbourhood data, however the total population of all of the neighbourhoods also comes to 2,393.

Demographics

Neighbourhoods

References 

Populated places in the Centre-Est Region